Geille is a surname. Notable people with the surname include:

Annick Geille, French journalist
Frédéric Geille (1896–1976), French military officer